Ferrargunj is one of five local administrative divisions of the Indian district of Andaman, part of the Indian union territory of Andaman and Nicobar Islands. The name is after Michael Lloyd Ferrar, a commissioner and butterfly collector.

It is a division known locally as a tehsil, roughly equivalent to a county in its range of administrative powers. It is located in the Andaman Islands.

Ferrargunj's population according to 2001 Census of India figures was 48,626.

Cities and towns in South Andaman district
South Andaman district